Pieter Eden Veldsman  (born 11 March 1952) is a former South African rugby union player.

Playing career
In 1969 and during his final year at school, Veldsman was selected to represent the Western Province schools team at the annual Craven Week tournament that was held in Pietermaritzburg. During the early seventies Veldsman played for the Western Province under–20 side and he made his senior provincial debut for Western Province in 1976.

Veldsman made his test match debut, which was also his only test for the Springboks, on 27 August 1977 against the World XV team at Loftus Versfeld in Pretoria. Along with Veldsman, there were seven other debutants in the 1977 test match, of whom five also played in only one test match for the Springboks.

Test history

See also
List of South Africa national rugby union players – Springbok no. 497

References

1952 births
Living people
South African rugby union players
South Africa international rugby union players
Western Province (rugby union) players
People from George, South Africa
Rugby union players from the Western Cape